Bachia trinitatis, commonly known as the Trinidad bachia or Trinidad worm lizard, is a species of lizard in the family Gymnophthalmidae. It is endemic to Trinidad and Tobago.

References

Bachia
Reptiles of Trinidad and Tobago
Endemic fauna of Trinidad and Tobago
Reptiles described in 1914
Taxa named by Thomas Barbour